Lycée Alain is a senior high school/sixth form college in Le Vésinet, Yvelines, France, in the Paris metropolitan area.

It is named after Émile Chartier, a.k.a. "Alain".

References

External links
 Lycée Alain 

Lycées in Yvelines